San Pablo Cuatro Venados  is a town and municipality in Oaxaca in south-western Mexico. The municipality covers an area of 59.96 km². 
It is part of the Zaachila District in the west of the Valles Centrales Region

As of 2005, the municipality had a total population of 1267.

Zaachila Zapotec is spoken in the town.

References

Municipalities of Oaxaca